Mário Schenberg (var. Mário Schönberg, Mario Schonberg, Mário Schoenberg; July 2, 1914 – November 10, 1990) was a Brazilian electrical engineer, physicist, art critic and writer.

Early life 
Schenberg was born in Recife, Brazil. His parents were Russian-Jews of German origin. From early on he showed remarkable ability for mathematics, enchanting himself with geometry, which had a strong influence on his works. Schenberg took the primary and secondary courses in Recife. Because of his family's financial limitations, he was not able to study in Europe. He then entered the Faculty of Engineering of Recife in 1931.

Scientific work

The Urca process 
Widely regarded as one of Brazil's most important theoretical physicists, Schenberg is best remembered for his contributions to astrophysics, particularly the theory of nuclear processes in the formation of supernova stars. He provided the inspiration for the name of the so-called Urca process, a cycle of nuclear reactions in which a nucleus loses energy by absorbing an electron and then re-emitting a beta particle plus a neutrino-antineutrino pair, leading to the loss of internal supporting pressure and consequent collapse and explosion in the form of a supernova. George Gamow (1904–1968) was inspired to name the process Urca after the name of a casino in Rio de Janeiro, when Schenberg remarked to him that "the energy disappears in the nucleus of the supernova as quickly as the money disappeared at that roulette table".

Schönberg–Chandrasekhar limit 
Together with Indian physicist Subrahmanyan Chandrasekhar (1910–1995), he discovered and published in 1942 the so-called Schönberg–Chandrasekhar limit, which is the maximum mass of the core of a star that can support the overlying layers against gravitational collapse, once the core hydrogen is exhausted.

Quantum physics and geometric algebra 
In the University of São Paulo had Schönberg interacted closely with David Bohm during the final years of Bohm's exile in Brazil, and in 1954 Schönberg demonstrated a link among the quantized motion of the Madelung fluid and the trajectories of the de Broglie–Bohm theory. He wrote a series of publications of 1957/1958 on geometric algebras that stand in relation to quantum physics and quantum field theory. He pointed out that those algebras can be described in terms of extensions of the commutative and the anti-commutative Grassmann algebras which have the same structure as the boson algebra and the fermion algebra of creation and annihilation operators. These algebras, in turn, are related to the symplectic algebra and Clifford algebra, respectively. In a paper published in 1958, Schönberg suggested to add a new idempotent to the Heisenberg algebra, and this suggestion was taken up and expanded upon in the 1980s by Basil Hiley and his co-workers in their work on algebraic formulations of quantum mechanics; this work was performed at Birkbeck College where Bohm had become professor of physics in the meantime. Schönberg's ideas have also been cited in connection with algebraic approaches to describe relativistic phase space.

His work has been cited, together with that of Marcel Riesz, for its importance to Clifford algebras and mathematical physics in the proceedings of a workshop held in France in 1989 which had been dedicated to these two mathematicians.

Politics and life 
Schenberg was also a member of the Brazilian Communist Party and professor of the University of São Paulo.

Articles 
His articles include:
 M. Schönberg: Quantum kinematics and geometry, Il Nuovo Cimento (1955–1965), vol. 6, Supplement 1, pp. 356–380, 1957,  (preview)
 M. Schönberg, S. Chandrasekhar: On the Evolution of the Main-Sequence Stars, Astrophysical Journal, vol. 96, no. p. 161 ff., 1942, fulltext

See also
 Mario Schenberg (Gravitational Wave Detector), a spherical, resonant-mass, gravitational wave detector , named after Mário Schenberg

References 

1914 births
1990 deaths
People from Recife
Brazilian people of Russian-Jewish descent
Brazilian people of German-Jewish descent
Brazilian physicists
Jewish Brazilian writers
Jewish socialists
Brazilian communists
University of São Paulo alumni
Academic staff of the University of São Paulo
20th-century Brazilian scientists
20th-century Brazilian people
Presidents of the Brazilian Physical Society